Siedlecki is a Polish surname (toponymic adjective of Siedlce). It can refer to:

 Jack Siedlecki (born 1951), American football coach
 Michał Marian Siedlecki (1873-1940), Polish zoologist
 Zygmunt Siedlecki (1907-1977), Polish athlete

 , Polish research ship

Polish-language surnames